Erickson Landing is an unincorporated community in Iron County, Michigan, United States.

Notes

Unincorporated communities in Iron County, Michigan
Unincorporated communities in Michigan